Eungella is a town located in north-eastern New South Wales, Australia, in the Tweed Shire.

Demographics

The median age of the Eungella population was 40 years, 3 years above the national median of 37.

81.8% of people living in Eungella were born in Australia. The other top responses for country of birth were New Zealand 3.8%, England 3.5%, Germany 1%, Croatia 1%, Myanmar (Burma) 1%.

93.4% of people spoke only English at home; the next most common languages were 1% Tamil, 1% Croatian, 1% French, 1% Bengali, 1% Greek.

References 

Suburbs of Tweed Heads, New South Wales